Sungai Buloh Depot (Malay: Depoh Sungai Buloh) is a railway yard near Sungai Buloh, Selangor, Malaysia, serving the MRT Kajang Line and the Putrajaya Line. It is located behind Kwasa Damansara MRT station.

Background
The depot was built at the site of the Rubber Research Institute of Malaysia (RRIM) estate, near the development project of Kwasa Damansara.

The depot houses a central maintenance facility with overhauling functions for trains of both the Kajang Line and the upcoming Putrajaya Line.

It is one of two yards for the Kajang Line, the other being the Kajang Depot, as well as being one of Rapid Rail's six yards in its network, the others being Kajang, Ampang, Kuala Sungai Baru, Subang and Brickfields.

Buildings and structures in Selangor
Petaling District
Rail yards in Malaysia